NewsLife is the flagship English language newscast of PTV, which was aired from July 2, 2012, to July 8, 2016, replacing Teledyaryo and was replaced by PTV News. Shown every weekdays at 9:15 pm Philippine Standard Time after the Philippine Lottery Draw, it is anchored by Catherine Vital, Richmond Cruz and Charmaine Espina.

NewsLife air their last broadcast on July 8, 2016, to make way for the return of PTV News.

Final Anchors
 Cathy Untalan
 Richmond Cruz
 Charmaine Espina

Final Segment Hosts
Atty. JJ Jimeno-Atienza (Rule Of Law Segment)
Desserie Dionio (Forecast Panahon.TV Segment)
Amor Larrosa (Forecast Panahon.TV Segment)

Former Anchors
 Robert Tan 
 Ysabella Montano (now with CNN Philippines)
 Angelica Movido (now with DZMM Radyo Patrol 630)
 Edmund Rosales 
 Bianca Saldua (left due to participation at Miss World Philippines 2013)
 Hajji Kaamiño (YouSurfer Segment) (now with Brigada News FM National)
 Harry Bayona (Forecast CNN Philippines)
 Earle Figuracion (Forecast CNN Philippines)
 Kring Lacson (YouSurfer Segment) 
 April Enerio (Forecast CNN Philippines)
 Georgina Ramos-Kettrick
 Jesy Basco (Forecast Panahon.TV Segment)
 Rachel Pelayo (Forecast Panahon.TV Segment)

See also
 List of programs aired by People's Television Network

Philippine television news shows
People's Television Network original programming
English-language television shows
2012 Philippine television series debuts
2016 Philippine television series endings